Astheim Charterhouse, also known as Marienbrück Charterhouse ( or Kartause Astheim, also Kartause Marienbrück), was a Carthusian monastery, or charterhouse, in Astheim near Volkach in Kitzingen, Bavaria, Germany.

History 
The charterhouse was founded on June 2, 1409, by Erkinger von Seinsheim and his first wife, Anna von Bibra, as a place of burial for their family, a function which the monastery served for several centuries for Erkinger's descendants, the Barons and later Princes von Schwarzenberg.  Erkinger, his second wife Barbara von Abensberg, and Anna's sons Michael and Hermann renewed and confirmed the charterhouse in 1434.

It was settled by Carthusian monks from Cologne Charterhouse.  It was dissolved in 1803 in the secularisation of Bavaria.

In 1804 the buildings passed into the ownership of the Princes of Schwarzenberg, descendants of the founder. Although most buildings were demolished, the church, built 1603–09, and the prior's lodging with a chapel of St. John (1583) remain extant. The church contains a Late Baroque high altar of 1723–24 with an altarpiece depicting Saint Bruno of Cologne (founder of the Carthusian Order) and the Virgin Mary by Oswald Onghers, and choir stalls of 1606, with Baroque fittings added in 1724.

Today the surviving buildings on the site accommodate the archives of the town of Volkach and from 1999 a museum, the Kartausenmuseum Astheim, run by the Diocese of Würzburg, specialising in Christian graphic art, on which theme it has about 600 exhibits.

Notes

References 
 Backmund, Norbert P., 1974: Die kleineren Orden in Bayern und ihre Klöster bis zur Säkularisation., pp. 59ff. Kloster Windberg.
 Link, Georg, nd: Klosterbuch der Diözese Würzburg II, pp. 296 ff.
 WILHELM FRHR. VON BIBRA, Beiträge zur Familien Geschichte der Reichsfreiherrn von Bibra, Ernster Band (vol. 1), 1880, pages 176–177.

Sources/ External links 

Klöster in Bayern: Astheim - Kartäuser am Main 
Website of the Diocese of Würzburg: Kartausenmuseum Astheim 
Website of Volkach: Kartausenmuseum Astheim 

Monasteries in Bavaria
Carthusian monasteries in Germany
Schwarzenberg family
Seinsheim family
1400s establishments in the Holy Roman Empire
1409 establishments in Europe
1803 disestablishments in the Holy Roman Empire